Henry Kermit Vingut (March 12, 1871 - May 10, 1928) was a stock broker and champion horse owner.

Biography
He was born in 1870 and married Edith Augusta Gaynor, daughter of the New York City mayor William Jay Gaynor in 1910. They divorced in 1919. He retired around 1918. He died on May 10, 1928.

References

External links

1871 births
1928 deaths